Angus Fraser James Gunn (born 22 January 1996) is a professional footballer who plays as a goalkeeper for EFL Championship club Norwich City. He has represented England at under-21 level.

Gunn began his career at his hometown club Norwich City, before joining Manchester City in 2011, signing his first professional contract in 2013. After spending the 2017–18 season on loan at Norwich, Gunn signed for Southampton in the summer of 2018, for a transfer fee of £13.5 million. After a return to the Championship with Stoke City for the 2020–21 season, he returned to Norwich on a permanent basis following their promotion back to the Premier League.

Early life
Gunn was born in Norwich, Norfolk, to Norwich City's former goalkeeper and manager Bryan and 
artist Susan Gunn. His father is originally from Thurso, Caithness, in the far north of Scotland. Gunn attended Alpington Primary School and Framingham Earl High School.

Club career

Manchester City
Gunn began his career at his hometown club Norwich City, before moving to Manchester City in 2011, for which a tribunal decided Manchester City had to pay £250,000. He signed a three-year professional contract in June 2013. He was named on the substitutes bench on a number of occasions throughout the 2016–17 season, but did not play for Manchester City that season.

For the 2017–18 season, Gunn was loaned back to Norwich of the EFL Championship. He made his first-team debut in Norwich's first match of the season, away to Fulham. He got his first professional football clean sheet on 16 August 2017, in a 2–0 home win over Queens Park Rangers at Carrow Road. He would ultimately be the only player to be ever present for Norwich in the league during the season, also being ever present in the FA Cup and making three appearances in the EFL Cup. At the end of the season, Norwich fans voted him third in the Player of the Season vote behind James Maddison and Grant Hanley.

Southampton
Gunn joined Southampton in July 2018, signing a five-year deal with the club, for a fee estimated at £13.5 million. He made his debut for the club on 28 August 2018 in an EFL Cup tie against Brighton & Hove Albion, and his Premier League debut on 2 January 2019, making several vital saves and keeping a clean sheet and earning the man of the match award in a 0–0 draw against Chelsea.

Stoke City (loan)
In October 2020 Gunn joined EFL Championship side Stoke City on loan for the 2020–21 season as a replacement for the departing Jack Butland. Gunn made his debut on 27 October 2020 against Swansea City coming on as a half time substitute for the injured Adam Davies. He kept his place for the next three matches before he suffered an ankle injury. Josef Bursik took his place in goal until both Gunn and Davies returned to fitness in January. Gunn made 15 appearances for Stoke until his season was ended by a foot injury in April 2021.

Norwich City
On 23 June 2021, Gunn made a permanent return to Norwich City, for an undisclosed fee.

International career

England
Despite his father Bryan representing Scotland at international level, Angus represented the country of his birth England at various youth levels.

Gunn received his first call up to the England national team in November 2017 for a friendly match against Brazil, after Jack Butland withdrew from the squad with an injury. In March 2018, Gunn was offered the opportunity by Scotland manager Alex McLeish to switch allegiances to Scotland, but decided to stay with the England national team, and was called up by Gareth Southgate to their training camp ahead of the 2018 FIFA World Cup.

Scotland
Gunn switched his international allegiance to Scotland in March 2023, and he was selected in their squad for UEFA Euro 2024 qualifying matches that month.

Career statistics

Honours
England U21
Toulon Tournament: 2016

References

External links

Southampton FC profile

1996 births
Living people
Footballers from Norwich
English footballers
England youth international footballers
England under-21 international footballers
Association football goalkeepers
Norwich City F.C. players
Manchester City F.C. players
Southampton F.C. players
Stoke City F.C. players
English Football League players
Premier League players
English people of Scottish descent
Footballers educated at St Bede's College, Manchester